Clayton Center is an unincorporated community located in Clayton County, Iowa, United States.

History
The area was settled as a German colony, approximately five miles east of Elkader. In April 1856, the land was surveyed by Lewis Brockman, who established the location as the "southeast quarter of section 8, township 93 north, range 3 west." Clayton Center was then platted on June 27, 1857, by Fred Hartmann. Clayton Center's population was 94 in 1902.

Education
Public schools are operated by the Clayton Ridge Community School District, which formed in 2005 with the merger of the Guttenberg and Garnavillo Community School Districts. Students were previously zoned to Garnavillo schools.

References

 

Unincorporated communities in Clayton County, Iowa
Unincorporated communities in Iowa
1857 establishments in Iowa
Populated places established in 1857